Charles Hedley Forbes (May 28, 1896 – 1979) was a Canadian politician. He served in the Legislative Assembly of New Brunswick as member of the Progressive Conservative party from 1939 to 1944.

References

1896 births
1979 deaths
20th-century Canadian politicians
Progressive Conservative Party of New Brunswick MLAs